For the county seat of Upton County, Texas, see: Rankin, Texas.

Rankin is an unincorporated community in Ellis County, Texas, United States.  The population was 12 in the 2000 census.  It was named for Frederick Harrison Rankin, who had settled on nearby Chambers Creek before 1874.

Geography
Rankin is located at  (32.211494, -96.706638).  It is approximately 15 miles southeast of Waxahachie on FM 984 near Gorman Rd.

References

Unincorporated communities in Ellis County, Texas
Unincorporated communities in Texas